Aloys Fischer (10 April 1880 – 23 November 1937) was a German educationalist.

Fischer was born in Furth im Wald, Bavaria on 10 April 1880. He attended the local elementary school. In 1891 he was awarded a scholarship to the grammar school based at the Benedictine Metten Abbey. He finished there 1899 and then attended the Ludwig Maximilian University in Munich studying Classical Philology, German and history. After passing the First State Exam in 1902 he studied for a doctorate under Theodor Lipps. From 1903 to 1906 Fischer tutored the children of Adolf von Hildebrand. His dissertation On symbolic Relations, was rewarded with a prize from the Faculty of Arts.

In 1906 he married Paula Thalmann, with whom he had two sons Ernst Maria (born 1907) and Peter Paul (born 1911).

References

1880 births
1937 deaths
German educational theorists